Memecylon sylvaticum is a species of plant in the family Melastomataceae. It is endemic to Sri Lanka. It is reportedly found in Dolukanda on an isolated hill in Kurunegala district.

References

sylvaticum
Vulnerable plants
Endemic flora of Sri Lanka
Taxonomy articles created by Polbot